Khandwa Airport  is a public airport located on Nagchun Road, 3 km north-west of the town of Khandwa in Madhya Pradesh, India. It does not have any scheduled flights.

References

External links 
 Khandwa Airport at the Airports Authority of India web site.

Defunct airports in India
Airports in Madhya Pradesh
Khandwa
Year of establishment missing